Scholtzia drummondii is a shrub species in the family Myrtaceae that is endemic to Western Australia.

It blooms between May and October producing pink-white flowers.

It is found on plains and ridges in the Wheatbelt region of Western Australia where it grows in gravelly-sandy soils.

References

drummondii
Plants described in 1867